The 1946–47 Western Kentucky State Teachers Hilltoppers men's basketball team represented Western Kentucky State Normal School and Teachers College (now known as Western Kentucky University) during the 1946-47 NCAA basketball season. The team was led by future Naismith Memorial Basketball Hall of Fame coach Edgar Diddle and leading scorer Odie Spears.  The Hilltoppers won the Kentucky Intercollegiate Athletic Conference and Southern Intercollegiate Athletic Association championships. 
Spears, Don “Duck” Ray, and Dee Gibson were named to the All-KIAC team, and Gibson and John Oldham made the All-SIAA team.

Schedule

|-
!colspan=6| 1947 Kentucky Intercollegiate Athletic Conference Tournament

|-
!colspan=6| 1947 Southern Intercollegiate Athletic Association Tournament

References

Western Kentucky Hilltoppers basketball seasons
Western Kentucky State Teachers
Western Kentucky State Teachers
Western Kentucky State Teachers